The 2014–15 Princeton Tigers women's basketball team represented Princeton University during the 2014–15 NCAA Division I women's basketball season. The Tigers, led by eighth year head coach Courtney Banghart, played their home games at Jadwin Gymnasium and were members of the Ivy League.

The Tigers finished the season 31–1, 14–0 to win the Ivy League regular season title, earning an automatic trip to the 2015 NCAA Division I women's basketball tournament in which they lost to Maryland in the second round. The Tigers' No. 13 ranking in both the Associated Press Top-25 and USA Today Coaches polls are the highest in Ivy League history. Princeton's No. 8 seed is the best an Ivy program has ever earned, and the Tigers' first round win over Green Bay was just the second NCAA victory for an Ivy team, joining No. 16 Harvard's upset over No. 1 Stanford in 1998.

In the January 10 conference opener against Penn, senior guard Blake Dietrick became the 22nd player in program history to surpass the 1,000-point mark. She finished the season ranked 11th in scoring with 1,233 points.

Roster

Schedule

|-
!colspan=8 style="background:#000000; color:#FF6F00;"| Regular season

|-
!colspan=8 style="background:#000000; color:#FF6F00;"| 2015 NCAA Women's Tournament

Source:

Rankings

See also
 2014–15 Princeton Tigers men's basketball team

References

Princeton
Princeton Tigers women's basketball seasons
Princeton
Princeton Tigers women's
Princeton Tigers women's